Aspen Mountain may refer to:

Aspen Mountain (Colorado), a mountain in Colorado
Aspen Mountain (ski area), a ski resort on the mountain
Aspen Mountain (Wyoming), a mountain in Wyoming

See also
 Aspen (disambiguation)